Hemilychas is a monotypic genus of scorpions in the Buthidae family. Its sole species is Hemilychas alexandrinus. It occurs widely across mainland Australia and was first described by Arthur Stanley Hirst in 1911.

Description
The scorpions are small and slender, growing to a maximum length of about 40 mm.

References

Hemilychas
Scorpions of Australia
Endemic fauna of Australia
Fauna of New South Wales
Fauna of the Northern Territory
Fauna of Queensland
Fauna of South Australia
Fauna of Victoria (Australia)
Fauna of Western Australia
Monotypic arachnid genera
Animals described in 1911
Taxa named by Arthur Stanley Hirst
Scorpion genera